James Nicholson (born 29 July 1957) is a Scottish retired amateur footballer who made nearly 240 appearances as a forward in the Scottish League for Queen's Park. He later served as president of the club.

Honours 
Queen's Park
 Scottish League Second Division: 1980–81

References

Scottish footballers
Scottish Football League players
Association football forwards
Queen's Park F.C. players
Living people
1957 births
Queen's Park F.C. non-playing staff
Association football wingers